Vito Bongiorno is an Italian artist known for making art out of charcoal.

Biography
Bongiorno was born in Alcamo (in the province of Trapani) in 1963; his childhood was eventful because of the different movings of his family. In fact, after living the terrible experience of the Belice Earthquake in 1968, he moved to Rome when he was only seven.  He  graduated in art school (at the Liceo Artistico Statale), where he was a pupil of Mino Delle Site, a representative of the movement of Aeropittura. In Rome he also attended some courses of life drawing, engraving and sculpture.

Activity
In order to enlarge his experience, he first moved to Munich, and then to New York City, where he exhibited his works, and got in touch with the most important artists. While realizing his works, Bongiorno considers the human body as a basic element of the artistic expression, and the environment as the scenery of the creative work.

In July 2009, Ludovico Corrao, the former senator and  president of the Museo delle Trame Mediterranee of the Foundation  Orestiadi di Gibellina, purchased the work  Oltremare a Gibellina for this museum. In this painting the sea blue colour should  bring a town to be rebuilt, beyond the ruins of the 1968 Belice Earthquake.

During his artistic career, in 2010 the writer Costanzo Costantini labelled Bongiorno as the Italian Yves Klein, referring to his anthropometry, in line with the French painter. The artist has recently denounced the fragility of his country and to express his denunciation he uses coal to symbolise disease, rift, bitterness and pollution.
 
One of his most recent artistic creations is  "Terra Mater" at the Museum of Contemporary Art of Rome, in May 2012. In November 2012 he won the Art & Crisis award organised by the magazine “INSIDEART” with his creation entitled Handle With Care.

In May 2014 he exhibited "Superfetazioni" at the Capitoline Museums in the Centrale Montemartini in Rome. His work "Fragile" was shown at the Maam Museum in Rome. 
In May 2015 he exhibited a solo show with the provocative title L’Italia brucia (Italy is burning) at the Sant’Andrea Gallery in Rome and then he executed a performance for Exploit in Milan. In the same year he intervened with an installation at the Cà Pesaro Museum in Venice on the occasion of the Venice Biennale.

He is present in the archive of the artists of Rome Quadriennale. Some of his works of art are present in the permanent collection of the Mutuo Soccorso Museum, in the Maam Museum in Rome, and at the MACA in Alcamo.
In 2019 he created the work "Our Planet", exhibited at the Macro Museum of Rome; on 12 October he also organized the anthological exhibition entitled Nostos at the Museum of Contemporary Art of Alcamo (MACA) in Alcamo.

Bongiorno lives and works between Fregene and Rome.

Prizes 
November 2012: Prize from the magazine “INSIDEART”, Arte & Crisi, with the work Handle with Care  
February 2013: Premio Adrenalina: winner of the prize from public and prize on line vote (gold categories) with the work It’s not a game, an acrylic on canvas and coal.
May 2022: Prize Donne in Amore (for the section Entertainment), organized by the Associazione Naschira, partner of the Barrett International Group of Virginia Barrett, Nathaly Caldonazzo and Vito Bongiorno have been awarded for the pictorial project “Squartalized”, which represents the states of mind and the wounds of the people who have suffered physical and psychological violence.

Recent Exhibitions 
Museo Macro la Pelanda in Rome: presented the work Terra mater, during the fair Roma contemporary and in collaboration with Inside Art (May 2012)
Ancona, Museo della Mole Vanvitelliana, with a performance dedicated to the artist Gino De Dominicis, (2012)
Fiumicino: he exhibits for Manualmente at Villa Guglielmi, (2013)
Rome, Galleria Opera Unica, "Sinite parvulos venire ad me", April 2013
Accademia di Romania, for the exhibition Osmosi, and at galleria Visiva for the show Censured: he takes part with one of his works
Rome, Musei Capitolini at Centrale Montemartini, with Superfetazioni; May 2014
Biennale of Viterbo, 2014
Triennale of Rome, presented by Achille Bonito Oliva, 2014
Naples,  his performance Terra Mater opens the Naf-Napoli Arte Fiera, 2015 
Rome, Galleria Sant’Andrea, a solo show entitled L’Italia brucia (Italy is burning), May 2015
Venice Biennale, Museo Ca' Pesaro, 2015
Viterbo, Galleria Miralli, a solo show entitled aureAttesa, April 2016 
Roma, Galleria Consorti at via Margutta, Black holes, June 2016
Assisi, Minigallery, Black holes, June 2016
Milan, takes part in the Affordable Art Fair, January 2017
Rome, Galleria Minima Arte Contemporanea, solo show entitled "Anime", July 2017
Rome, Galleria Fidia, solo show entitled  Metamorfosi Materiche, February 2018
Rome, Museo d'Arte Contemporanea (MACRO) of Rome, February 2019

See also
Gino Patti
Turi Simeti
Aeropittura
Body Art
Land art

References

External links

Vito Bongiorno in Treccani
Vito Bongiorno in Telegram
https://romeartweek.com/it/artisti/?id=1247&ida=726
http://www.vitobongiorno.it/biografia-di-vito-bongiorno/
https://www.siciliaogginotizie.it/2019/02/11/lartista-alcamese-vito-bongiorno-al-macro-di-roma/
http://www.ideazionenews.it/articoli/45182/lartista-alcamese-bongiorno-in-mostra-al-macro-di-roma/
http://insideart.eu/2012/11/20/il-bongiorno-si-vede-dal-blu/
http://insideart.eu/2012/05/31/roma-contemporary-la-terza-giornata/

1963 births
20th-century Italian male artists
21st-century Italian male artists
People from Alcamo
Living people